Tekgarh is a village in the Punjab province of Pakistan. It is located at 30°24'0N 72°39'0E with an altitude of 146 metres (482 feet).The nearest airport is LYP-faisalabad Intl.

References

http://nona.net/features/map/placedetail.2150515/Tekgarh/
Location of Tekgarh - Falling Rain Genomics

Villages in Punjab, Pakistan